Jackyl is an American rock band formed in 1991. Their sound has also been described as heavy metal and southern metal. Their self-titled debut album has sold more than a million copies in the United States with hit singles like "Down on Me" and "When Will It Rain". The band is best known for the song "The Lumberjack", which features a chainsaw solo by lead singer Jesse James Dupree.

History

Debut album 
In 1992, Jackyl's self-titled debut album was released under Geffen Records, and eventually went platinum. It features a song entitled "She Loves My Cock", which was omitted from edited versions, as were suggestive elements on the album's cover art. When a Kmart in Georgia refused to sell Jackyl, the band played an impromptu concert in front of the store. Footage of the event was used for the music video of their single "I Stand Alone".

Push Comes to Shove 
Their second album released in 1994 is titled Push Comes to Shove. Also that year, the band appeared at Woodstock '94 in Saugerties, New York. The album contains the singles "Push Comes to Shove" and "Headed for Destruction".

Cut the Crap 
Jackyl released Cut the Crap in 1997. Its hit song "Locked and Loaded" featured guest vocals from AC/DC's Brian Johnson.
Johnson also teamed up with the band for their 2002 album Relentless.

Choice Cuts 
The band's first greatest hits album, Choice Cuts, arrived in 1998.  Geffen Records produced a music video for their cover of We're an American Band, a 1970s hit song by Grand Funk Railroad.

Stayin' Alive 
Choice Cuts failed to revive the band's sales and touring success, so Geffen Records and JACKYL parted company.  Later that year, Stayin' Alive was released by their new record-label, Shimmer Tone.  Recognized as Jackyl's fourth studio album, of the eleven tracks, three are covers of other bands' songs, and three are live versions of previously-released songs.

Foot Fetish (solo album) 
In 2000, lead singer Dupree recorded a solo album entitled Foot Fetish.

"Open Invitation" 
Less than a month after the events of the September 11, 2001 attacks, Jackyl recorded and released "Open Invitation", which received wide airplay and featured lyrics that included, "I hate you bin Laden" and "You've got an open invitation to kiss our ass."  The song mixed in clips from George C. Scott's portrayal of George S. Patton giving a speech to his soldiers in the movie Patton and President George W. Bush reading from the Bible's Shepherd's Psalm Psalm 23:4.  The band has described their song and lyrics as: "This song is written in the key of 'ANGER' that such a thing can happen in this country. It's not directed toward any religious group or race of people. It is directed toward those 'assholes' responsible."

Relentless 
In 2002, Jackyl released Relentless and took part in the Rock Never Stops Tour. A music video for "Billy Badass" was made.

20th Century Masters – The Millennium Collection: The Best of Jackyl 
The following year, a second greatest hits compilation was produced entitled 20th Century Masters – The Millennium Collection: The Best of Jackyl.

When Moonshine and Dynamite Collide 
In 2010, the band released When Moonshine and Dynamite Collide, releasing several singles and music videos to promote it such as the hit "Just Like A Negro" featuring Run-D.M.C.

In December 2011 Dupree appeared in That Metal Show where talked about chainsaws, his recent injuries, marathon touring and all things of Jackyl with Sully Erna from Godsmack and Glenn Hughes as guests too.

Best in Show and concurrent release of Up to No Good by Nigel Dupree Band 

Later on in 2012, the band started working on a new album, and laid down tracks for a song called "Screwdriver" which is to be released on their album Best in Show on July 31, 2012.  For the first time, in honor of Father's Day, Jackyl and Nigel Dupree Band (the latter fronted by vocalist Nigel Thomas Dupree, son of Dupree) were releasing their studio albums simultaneously.  Best in Show and Up to No Good (the latter being the 2012 album from the Nigel Dupree Band) were set to be released on July 31, 2012.  The first singles from Best in Show and Up to No Good, titled "Screwdriver" and "Tumbleweed", respectively, were issued concurrently on June 17, 2012, with an add date at radio of June 26, 2012. It also was released "Favorite Sin" as radio single charting No. 42 in US Mainstream Rock Chart.

Rowyco  
In May 2016, the ensemble announced that they plan to release a studio album entitled Rowyco in the latter part of the year. The album was released on August 5, 2016. *Rated as one of the top 5 best rock albums of 2016/2017.

Guinness World Records 
Jackyl has set two Guinness world records, one for playing 100 concerts in 50 days, and one for performing 21 concerts in a 24-hour period.

Full Throttle Saloon 

Dupree and Jackyl could be seen on TruTV's Full Throttle Saloon, a reality show which documented the happenings at the famous South Dakota saloon during the crazy days of the Sturgis bike rally.  Dupree is close friends with the saloon owner, Mike Ballard, and also produces the show.

Band members

Current members 
Jesse James Dupree – lead vocals, guitar, gas chainsaw, tambourine, megaphone
Jeff Worley- guitar, backing vocals
Roman Glick – bass, backing vocals
Chris Worley – drums

Former members 
Jimmy Stiff – guitar, backing vocals
Ronnie Honeycutt – vocals
Thomas Bettini – bass
Cliff Witherspoon – bass

Discography

Studio albums

Other albums

Singles

References

External links 

 Official website
 

American glam metal musical groups
American hard rock musical groups
Heavy metal musical groups from Georgia (U.S. state)
Musical groups from Atlanta
Musical groups established in 1991
Musical quartets
American southern rock musical groups
1991 establishments in Georgia (U.S. state)